William White (June 25, 1921 - July 14, 1985) was a film producer and actor. The films he has been involved with in production include Where's Willie?, and House of the Black Death.  He also directed  Brother, Cry for Me, and Divorce Las Vegas Style.

Background
White was born in Missouri on June 25, 1921. He died of a heart attack on July 14, 1985 in Sherman Oaks, California.

Actor Jeff F. Renfro who played the psychotic trucker in The Bunny Game is his stepson.

Career

Actor
White had an involvement in films and television from 1927 to the late 1970s.
He had an early role playing the butcher boy in Peaceful Oscar which was released around 1927. Later he had a role in the William Clemens directed Here Comes Carter which was released in 1936. He played the part of Police Lt. Peterson in the 1959 horror film, The Hideous Sun Demon. The film which was directed by Tom Boutross and Robert Clarke, featured Nan Peterson, Del Courtney, Tony Hilder, and Bob Hafner. During the 1960s, one film he appeared in was Terror of the Bloodhunters. Released in 1963, the film starred Robert Clarke and Dorothy Haney. Other films in that decade were Attack of the Mayan Mummy in 1964, and The Human Duplicators in 1965. It's likely his last acting work was as Jesse in the Ace in the Hole episode of The Green Hornet.The Encyclopedia of Superheroes on Film and Television, 2d ed., By John Kenneth Muir -  Page 313 The Green Hornet

Director and producer
He directed and wrote the story for Divorce Las Vegas Style, which was released in 1970. It starred John Alderman, Luanne Roberts, and  Dixie Donovan. Another film he directed that was released the same year was Brother, Cry for Me, a film that starred Steve Drexel, Leslie Parrish, Larry Pennell, Richard Davalos, and Anthony Caruso.Imdb - Brother, Cry for Me  (1970), Full Cast & Crew  He wrote the story and co-produced Where's Willie'' which was released in 1978.

Filmography (actor)

Filmography (director, producer etc)

References

External links
 

1921 births
1985 deaths
20th-century American male actors
Male actors from St. Louis
American film directors
Film producers from Missouri